Tayto Crisps is a crisps and popcorn manufacturer in Ireland, founded by Joe Murphy in May 1954 and owned by German snack food company Intersnack. Tayto invented the first flavoured crisp production process. The first seasoned crisps produced were Cheese & Onion. Companies worldwide sought to buy the rights to Tayto's technique. Tayto crisps are a cultural phenomenon throughout Republic of Ireland, so much so that in November 2010, Tayto opened their own theme park called "Tayto Park" near Ashbourne.

Tayto Crisps manufactured in the Republic of Ireland by Tayto Snacks should not be confused with Tayto Limited in Northern Ireland, which is a completely separate brand. The Northern Irish Tayto is widely sold in Northern Ireland and Great Britain whereas Tayto is sold in Republic of Ireland only.

Ownership
The Republic of Ireland company Tayto was owned by Largo Foods. It was previously owned by Cantrell and Cochrane (C. & C), and was based in Coolock, County Dublin, until their factory was closed in September 2005 and production was outsourced to Largo. Largo agreed to purchase the brand from C. & C. in May 2006 for €62.3 million.

In 2015, Ray Coyle sold his remaining shares of Largo foods to German food company Intersnack, ending the Irish ownership of the company. In Northern Ireland, Tayto Limited is still owned and run by the Hutchinson family and is totally different to Tayto in Republic of Ireland.

The original Tayto crisp factory was founded in 1954 in Dublin by a local man known as Joe 'Spud' Murphy, who is credited with having invented the world's first flavoured crisp.

Brands 

Tayto crisps come in several flavours: Cheese & Onion, Salt & Vinegar, Smokey Bacon, Prawn Cocktail, and the limited edition flavour Tex Mex.

In the early 2000s, the company targeted the healthy eating market, with its low salt, low fat crisps, originally branded as Honest. Tayto referred to this range as the Happy & Healthy range. The healthy range has since evolved and Tayto have launched Tayto Lentils which is 40% less fat to target the healthy eating market. 

Tayto Snack's portfolio of brands in the Republic of Ireland includes Tayto, King, O'Donnells of Tipperary, Hunky Dorys, Hula Hoops, Popchips, KP, Penn State, Pom-bear, & McCoy's.

Marketing
Tayto has used its mascot, Mr Tayto, in a number of marketing campaigns with previous endorsers such as Westlife. In the 2007 Irish General Election, Tayto ran an advertising campaign with Mr Tayto as a fake election candidate. Tayto claimed that the number of spoiled votes in the Carlow–Kilkenny constituency indicate that some actually voted for their mascot, but this is purely speculative. Tayto was fined during the campaign for littering, due to its fake election posters being posted in public places.

In 2009 Tayto Ltd. published The Man Inside the Jacket, a fictional autobiography of Mr Tayto written by Maia Dunphy, Ciaran Morrison and Mick O'Hara. Tayto indicated that a percentage of the cover price would go to Irish charity Aware, which assists people affected by depression, bipolar disorder and related mood conditions.

In May 2022 the Mr. Tayto mascot was removed from all Cheese & Onion packaging, and a "Where Is Mr. Tayto" tagline was added. Later that month, a statement was made from Mr. Tayto's official social media accounts which claimed that Mr. Tayto was taking a break from work to see the world, beginning the "Mr. Tayto's Bucket List" campaign.

Tayto Park 

In November 2010, Tayto, in association with Ray Coyle, a local businessman, opened a theme park, "Tayto Park", near Ashbourne in County Meath In February 2022, it was announced that the existing title sponsorship contract would not be renewed, with the park renamed to "Emerald Park" when the existing contract expired in January 2023.

Legal action 
In 2006, Tayto tried to compel Irish band Toasted Heretic to destroy all copies of their album Now in New Nostalgia Flavour, which featured an image based on the trademarked "Mr Tayto" icon, although the image had been used since 1988 on Toasted Heretic's cassette album Songs for Swinging Celibates.

References

External links
Tayto
Mr Tayto's site

Brand name snack foods
Food and drink companies established in 1954
Food and drink companies of Ireland
Irish brands
1954 establishments in Ireland